The 1905 Canton Athletic Club season was their inaugural season in the Ohio League. The team finished 8–2, giving them second place in the league.

Schedule

References

Canton Bulldogs seasons
Canton Bulldogs
Canton Bulldogs